The Portuguese Rugby Federation is the governing body for rugby union in Portugal. It was founded in 1926 and became affiliated to the International Rugby Board in 1988. The Portuguese Rugby Federation organises the main rugby union championship of Portugal, the Campeonato Nacional de Rugby, and oversees the country's national teams—men's and women's, age-grade teams, and sevens teams for both men and women.

National teams
Portugal national rugby union team
Portugal national rugby sevens team
Portugal women's national rugby union team

References

External links
 Federação Portuguesa de Rugby Official Site
Article on Portugal making the 2007 Rugby World Cup for the first time
Federação Portuguesa de Rugby - Facebook page (https://www.facebook.com/portugalrugbyoficial/)

Rugby union in Portugal
Rugby union governing bodies in Europe
Rugby Union
World Rugby members
Sports organizations established in 1926